Oumar Ben Salah (born 2 July 1964) is a former Ivorian international footballer who played as a midfielder.

Honours

Clubs
 Côte d'Ivoire Cup: 1984
 Coupe Houphouët-Boigny: 1985

International
 Africa Cup of Nations: 1992
 FIFA Confederations Cup participation: 1992 (4th place)

References

External links
 

1964 births
Living people
Footballers from Abidjan
Association football midfielders
Ivorian footballers
Ivory Coast international footballers
1992 King Fahd Cup players
Ligue 1 players
Stade d'Abidjan players
FC Sète 34 players
Le Mans FC players
1986 African Cup of Nations players
1988 African Cup of Nations players
1990 African Cup of Nations players
1992 African Cup of Nations players
Ivorian expatriate footballers
Expatriate footballers in France
Africa Cup of Nations-winning players
AC Avignonnais players